The women's 100 metres event at the 1975 Pan American Games was held in Mexico City on 13 and 14 October.

Medalists

Results

Heats

Wind:Heat 1: 0.0 m/s, Heat 2: +1.2 m/s, Heat 3: +1.6 m/s, Heat 4: -0.5 m/s

Semifinals
Wind:Heat 1: +1.0 m/s, Heat 2: 0.0 m/s

Final
Wind: -1.6 m/s

References

Athletics at the 1975 Pan American Games
1975